Riversleigh Station is a pastoral property within the City of Mount Isa, Queensland, Australia. It is known for the UNESCO World Heritage listed Australian Fossil Mammal Sites.

References

City of Mount Isa
Stations (Australian agriculture)